Jules-Henri Vernoy de Saint-Georges (7 November 1799 – 23 December 1875) was a  French playwright, who was born and died in Paris. He was one of the most prolific librettists of the 19th century, often working in collaboration with others.

Saint-Georges' first work,  (1823), a comédie en vaudeville written in collaboration with Alexandre Tardif, was followed by a series of operas and ballets. In 1829 he became manager of the Opéra-Comique at Paris.

Among Saint-Georges' more famous libretti are: the ballet Giselle (with Théophile Gautier) (1841), the opera  (1835) for Halévy, the opera  (with Jean-François Bayard) (1840) for Donizetti, and the opera  for Georges Bizet. Virtually all his opera libretti are for opéras comiques, although  (1841), for Halévy, was a grand opera.

In all Saint-Georges wrote over seventy stage pieces in collaboration with Eugène Scribe and other authors.o He also wrote novels, including .

Saint-Georges was notably old-fashioned in his approach, typically depending on highly improbable coincidences and twists with little attempt at convincing characterisation. His tastes were reflected in his personal affectation of 18th-century costume and manners in his everyday life.

Works

Librettos 

 , one-act opéra comique, with Constant Ménissier, music by François-Joseph Fétis, Paris, Théâtre de l'Opéra-Comique, 7 June 1825
 , three-act opéra comique, with Joseph-François-Stanislas Maizony de Lauréal, music by Wolfgang Amadeus Mozart, Théâtre de l'Odéon, 7 June 1825
 , one-act opéra comique, music by Jacques Fromental Halévy, Théâtre de l'Opéra-Comique, 30 January 1827
 , one-act opéra comique, music by Victor Rifaut and Jacques Fromental Halévy, Théâtre de l'Opéra-Comique, 3 November 1827
 , one-act opéra-comique, music by Adolphe Adam, Théâtre de l'Opéra-Comique, 18 July 1829
 , three-act opéra-comique, music by Michele Enrico Carafa, Théâtre de l'Opéra-Comique, 24 September 1829
 , drame lyrique in 2 actes, music by Ferdinand Hérold and Jacques-Fromental Halévy, Théâtre de l'Opéra-Comique, 16 May 1833
 , one-act opéra comique, music by Victor Rifaut, Théâtre de l'Opéra-Comique, 9 December 1834
 , one-act opéra comique, with Adolphe de Leuven, music by Adolphe Adam, Théâtre de l'Opéra-Comique, 28 February 1835
 , three-act opéra comique, with Eugène de Planard, music by Jacques-Fromental Halévy, Théâtre de l'Opéra-Comique, 16 December 1835
 , one-act opéra comique, with Adolphe de Leuven, music by Hippolyte Monpou, Théâtre de l'Opéra-Comique, 30 June 1836
 , three-act opéra comique, by Eugène Scribe, music by Daniel-François-Esprit Auber, Théâtre de l'Opéra-Comique, 21 December 1836
 , drame lyrique in 3 acts, with Eugène de Planard, music by George Onslow, Théâtre de l'Opéra-Comique, 8 September 1837
 , three-act opéra comique, with Eugène Scribe, music by Adolphe Adam, Théâtre de l'Opéra-Comique, 6 January 1838
 , ballet-pantomime in 3 acts and 5 tableaux, with Joseph Mazilier, music by François Benoist, Ambroise Thomas, and Marco Aurelio Marliani, Théâtre de l'Opéra, 28 January 1839
 Le Planteur, two-act opéra comique, music by Hippolyte Monpou, Théâtre de l'Opéra-Comique, 1 March 1839
 La Reine d'un jour, three-act opéra comique, with Eugène Scribe, music by Adolphe Adam, Théâtre de l'Opéra-Comique, 19 September 1839
 La Filleule des fées, ballet-féerie in 3 acts and 7 tableaux with prologue and apotheosis, with Jules Perrot, music by Adolphe Adam, Théâtre de l'Opéra, 8 October 1849. 
 La Symphonie, ou Maître Albert, one-act opéra comique, music by Louis Clapisson, Théâtre de l'Opéra-Comique, 12 October 1839
 La Fille du régiment, two-act opéra comique, with Jean-François Bayard, music by Gaetano Donizetti, Théâtre de l'Opéra-Comique, 11 February 1840
 Zanetta, ou Il ne faut pas jouer avec le feu, three-act opéra comique, with Eugène Scribe, music by Daniel-François-Esprit Auber, Théâtre de l'Opéra-Comique, 18 May 1840
 L'Opéra à la cour, opéra comique in 4 parts, with Eugène Scribe, music arranged by Albert Grisar and François Adrien Boieldieu, Théâtre de l'Opéra-Comique, 16 July 1840
 Le Diable amoureux, ballet-pantomime in 3 acts and 8 tableaux, with Joseph Mazilier, music by François Benoist and Henri Reber, Académie royale de musique, 21 September 1840
 Les Diamants de la couronne, three-act opéra comique, with Eugène Scribe, music by Daniel-François-Esprit Auber, Théâtre de l'Opéra-Comique, 6 March 1841
 Giselle, ou les Wilis, ballet fantastique in 2 acts, with Théophile Gautier and Jean Coralli, music by Adolphe Adam, Académie royale de musique, 28 June 1841
 L'Aïeule, one-act opéra comique, music by François Adrien Boieldieu, Théâtre de l'Opéra-Comique, 17 August 1841
 La Reine de Chypre, five-act opera, music by Jacques-Fromental Halévy, Académie royale de musique, 22 December 1841
 La Jolie Fille de Gand, ballet-pantomime in three acts and nine tableaux, music by Adolphe Adam, Académie royale de musique, 22 June 1842
 L'Esclave du Camoëns, one-act opéra-comique, music by Friedrich von Flotow, Théâtre de l'Opéra-Comique, 1 December 1843
 Cagliostro, three-act opéra comique, with Eugène Scribe, music by Adolphe Adam, Théâtre de l'Opéra-Comique, 10 February 1844
 Lady Henriette, ou la Servante de Greenwich, ballet-pantomime in 3 acts and 9 tableaux, with Joseph Mazilier, music by Friedrich von Flotow, Friedrich Burgmüller and Ernest Deldevèze, Paris, Académie royale de musique, 22 February 1844
 Le Lazzarone, ou Le bien vient en dormant, opera in 2 acts, music by Jacques Fromental Halévy, Académie royale de musique, 29 March 1844
 Wallace, three-act opéra comique, music by Charles Simon Catel, Théâtre de l'Opéra-Comique, 4 December 1844
 Les Mousquetaires de la Reine, three-act opéra comique, music by Jacques Fromental Halévy, Théâtre de l'Opéra-Comique, 3 February 1846
 L'Âme en peine, opéra-ballet fantastique in 2 acts, music by Friedrich von Flotow, Théâtre de l'Opéra, 29 June 1846
 Le Val d'Andorre, three-act opéra comique, music by Jacques-Fromental Halévy, Théâtre de l'Opéra-Comique, 11 November 1848
 La Fée aux roses, opéra comique, three-act féerie, with Eugène Scribe, music by Jacques-Fromental Halévy, Théâtre de l'Opéra-Comique, 1 October 1849
 Le Fanal, two-act opera, music by Adolphe Adam, Théâtre de l'Opéra, 24 December 1849
 La Serafina, ou l'Occasion fait le larron, one-act opéra comique, with Henri Dupin, music by M. de Saint-Julien, Théâtre de l'Opéra-Comique, 16 August 1851
 Le Château de la Barbe-bleue, three-act opéra comique, music by Armand Limnander, Théâtre de l'Opéra-Comique, 1 December 1851
 La Fille de Pharaon, grand ballet in three acts and eight tableaux with prologue and epilogue, St-Petersburg, Grand théâtre Impérial, 18 January 1852
 , three-act opéra comique, music by Albert Grisar, Théâtre de l'Opéra-Comique, 20 February 1852
 Le Juif errant, five-act opera, with Eugène Scribe, music by Jacques Fromental Halévy, Théâtre de l'Opéra, 23 April 1852
 Les Amours du diable, opéra-féerie in 4 acts, 9 tableaux, music by Albert Grisar, Théâtre-Lyrique, 13 March 1853
 Le Nabab, three-act opéra comique, with Eugène Scribe, music by Jacques-Fromental Halévy, Théâtre de l'Opéra-Comique, 1 September 1853
 Jaguarita l'indienne, three-act opéra comique, with Adolphe de Leuven, music by Jacques Fromental Halévy, Théâtre-Lyrique, 14 May 1855
Falstaff, one-act opéra-comique, with Adolphe de Leuven, after William Shakespeare's The Merry Wives of Windsor, music by Adolphe Adam, 18 January 1856
 Le Corsaire, ballet-pantomime in 3 acts, after Lord Byron, with Joseph Mazilier, music by Adolphe Adam, Théâtre de l'Opéra, 23 January 1856
 La Fanchonnette, three-act opéra comique, with Adolphe de Leuven, music by Louis Clapisson, Théâtre-Lyrique, 1 March 1856
 Les Elfes, ballet fantastique in 3 acts, with Joseph Mazilier, music by Nicolò Gabrielli, Théâtre de l'Opéra, 11 August 1856
 La Rose de Florence, two-act opera, music by Emanuele Biletta, Théâtre de l'Académie impériale de musique, 10 November 1856
 Le Sylphe, two-act opéra comique, music by Louis Clapisson, Théâtre de l'Opéra-Comique, 27 November 1856
 Euryanthe, three-act opera, libretto by Helmina von Chézy, translation by Henri de Saint-Georges and Adolphe de Leuven, music by Carl Maria von Weber, Théâtre-Lyrique, 1 September 1857
 Margot, three-act opéra comique, with Adolphe de Leuven, music by Louis Clapisson, Théâtre-Lyrique, 5 November 1857
 La Magicienne, five-act opera, music by Jacques Fromental Halévy, Théâtre de l'Opéra, 17 March 1858
 La Pagode, two-act opéra comique, music by Antoine-François Fauconnier, Théâtre de l'Opéra-Comique, 20 September 1859
 Pierre de Médicis, opera in 4 acts and 7 tableaux, with Émilien Pacini, music by Joseph Poniatowski, Académie impériale de musique, 9 March 1860
 Le papillon, ballet-pantomime in 2 acts and 4 tableaux, with Marie Taglioni, music by Jacques Offenbach, Théâtre de l'Opéra, 26 November 1860
 Maître Claude, one-act opéra comique, with Adolphe de Leuven, music by Jules Cohen, Théâtre de l'Opéra-Comique, 19 March 1861
 Au travers du mur, one-act opéra comique, music by Józef Poniatowski, Théâtre-Lyrique, 9 May 1861
 Le Joaillier de Saint-James, three-act opéra comique, with Adolphe de Leuven, music byAlbert Grisar, Théâtre de l'Opéra-Comique, 17 February 1862
 La Fiancée du roi de Garbe, opéra comique in 3 acts and 6 tableaux, with Eugène Scribe, music by Daniel-François-Esprit Auber, Théâtre de l'Opéra-Comique, 11 January 1864
 La Maschera, ou les Nuits de Venise, ballet-pantomime in 3 acts and 6 tableaux, with Giuseppe Rota, music by Paolo Giorza, Théâtre de l'Opéra, 19 February 1864
 L'Aventurier, four-act opéra comique, music by Joseph Poniatowski, Théâtre-Lyrique, 26 January 1865
 Martha, opera in 4 acts and 6 tableaux, music by Friedrich von Flotow, Théâtre-Lyrique, 15 December 1865
 Zilda, conte des mille et une nuits, two-act opéra comique, with Henri Chivot, music by Friedrich von Flotow, Théâtre de l'Opéra-Comique, 28 May 1866
 La Jolie fille de Perth, opera in 4 acts and 5 tableaux, with Jules Adenis, music by Georges Bizet, Théâtre-Lyrique, 29 December 1867
 L'Ombre, three-act opéra comique, music by Friedrich von Flotow, Théâtre de l'Opéra-Comique, 7 July 1870
 Le Florentin, three-act opéra comique, music by Charles Lenepveu, Théâtre de l'Opéra-Comique, 25 February 1874
 Alma l'enchanteresse, four-act opera, adapted to the Italian stage by Achille de Lauzières, music by Friedrich von Flotow, Théâtre des Italiens, 9 April 1878

Theatre

 L'Écarté, ou Un coin du salon, tableau-vaudeville in 1 act, with Eugène Scribe and Mélesville, Théâtre du Gymnase, 14 November 1822
 La Saint-Louis, ou les Deux dîners, vaudeville in 1 act, with Alexandre Tardif, Théâtre de Versailles, 25 August 1823
 L'Amour et l'appétit, one-act comédie en vaudeville, with Frédéric de Courcy and Saint-Elme, Théâtre de la Porte-Saint-Martin, 14 October 1823
 Monsieur Antoine, ou le N ̊ 2782, vaudeville in 1 act, with Francis baron d'Allarde and X. B. Saintine, Théâtre du Vaudeville, 17 May 1824
 Une journée aux Champs-Élysées, one-act tableau mingled with vaudevilles, with Constant Ménissier and Léon Rabbe, Théâtre de la Gaîté, 3 November 1824
 Les Recruteurs, ou la Fille du fermier, two-act play, extravaganza, with Antonio Franconi and Pierre Carmouche, Cirque-Olympique, 13 April 1825
 Belphégor, ou le Bonnet du diable, one-act vaudeville-féerie, with Achille d'Artois and Jules Vernet, Théâtre du Vaudeville, 26 April 1825
 Le Petit monstre et l'escamoteur, one-act folie-parade, with Antoine Jean-Baptiste Simonnin, Théâtre de la Gaîté, 7 July 1826
 La Robe et l'uniforme, comedy in 1 act mingled with couplets, with Pierre Carmouche, Théâtre de l'Ambigu-Comique, 20 September 1826
 Le Créancier voyageur, one-act comédie en vaudeville, with Martin Saint-Ange, Théâtre de la Porte-Saint-Martin, 30 September 1826
 1750 et 1827, vaudeville in 2 tableaux, with Émile Balisson de Rougemont and Antoine Jean-Baptiste Simonnin, Théâtre du Vaudeville, 13 September 1827
 Le Grand Dîner, one-act tableau-vaudeville, by Antoine Jean-Baptiste Simonnin, Théâtre du Vaudeville, 25 February 1828
 Le Concert à la campagne, one-act intermède, with Léon Halévy, Théâtre de l'Odéon, 26 October 1828
 Le Prêteur sur gages, three-act drama, with Antony Béraud, Théâtre de la Gaîté, 18 July 1829
 Folbert, ou le Marie de la cantatrice, one-act comedy, mingled with couplets, with Léon Halévy, Théâtre des Variétés, 7 February 1832
 La Prima donna, ou la Sœur de lait, comedy mingled with song, with Achille d'Artois, Théâtre des Variétés, 26 November 1832
 Tigresse Mort-aux-rats, ou Poison et contre poison, medicine in 4 doses and in verse, with Henri Dupin, Théâtre des Variétés, 22 February 1833
 Le Bal des Variétés, two-act folie-vaudeville, with Adolphe de Leuven, Théâtre des Variétés, 28 January 1835
 Farinelli, ou le Bouffe du Roi, three-act historical comedy, with Auguste Pittaud de Forges, Théâtre du Palais-Royal, 17 February 1835
 L'Aumônier du régiment, one-act comedy mingled with couplets, with Adolphe de Leuven, Théâtre du Palais-Royal, 1 October 1835
 Léona, ou le Parisien en Corse, two-act comedy mingled with song, with Adolphe de Leuven, Théâtre du Palais-Royal, 14 January 1836
 Laurette, ou le Cachet rouge, one-act comédie en vaudeville, with Adolphe de Leuven, Théâtre du Vaudeville, 28 January 1836
 Le Jeune Père, one-act comédie en vaudeville, with Achille d'Artois, Théâtre des Variétés, 30 July 1836
 Riquiqui, three-act comedy, mingled with song, with Adolphe de Leuven, Théâtre du Palais-Royal, 11 March 1837
 La Maîtresse de langues, one-act comedy, mingled with song, with Adolphe de Leuven and Dumanoir, Théâtre du Palais-Royal, 21 February 1838
 La Suisse à Trianon, one-act comedy, mingled with songs, with Adolphe de Leuven and Louis-Émile Vanderburch, Théâtre des Variétés, 9 March 1838
 Lady Melvil, ou le Joaillier de Saint-James, three-act comedy, mingled with song, with Adolphe de Leuven, music by Albert Grisar, Théâtre de la Renaissance, 5 November 1838
 Dagobert, ou la Culotte à l'envers, drame historique et drôlatique, in 3 acts and in verse, preceded  by a prologue in verse, with Adolphe de Leuven and Paulin Deslandes, Théâtre du Palais-Royal, 24 January 1839
 Mademoiselle Nichon, one-act comédie en vaudeville, with Adolphe de Leuven, Théâtre des Variétés, 28 January 1839
 Mademoiselle de Choisy, two-act comédie en vaudeville, with Bernard Lopez, Théâtre des Variétés, 3 April 1848
 L'Espion du grand monde, five-act drama, with Théodore Anne, Théâtre de l'Ambigu-Comique, 22 February 1856
 Une conférence, saynète in verse, Théâtre de Madame la Duchesse de Riario-Sforza, 21 February 1867
 Mademoiselle la Marquise, five-act comedy, in prose, preceded by a prologue, with Lockroy, Théâtre de l'Odéon, 12 February 1869

Novels

 Les Nuits terribles (1821)
 L'Espion du grand monde (7 tomes en 3 volumes, 1850)
 Un mariage de prince. Le Livre d'heures. L'Auto-da-fé (2 volumes, 1852)
 Les Princes de Maquenoise (12 volumes, 1860)
 Les Yeux verts, histoire fantastique (1872)

References 

Grove's Dictionary of Music and Musicians, Saint-Georges, Jules-Henri Vernoy de.

19th-century French dramatists and playwrights
19th-century French novelists
French opera librettists
French ballet librettists
Writers from Paris
1799 births
1875 deaths